Rychnów  (German Reichen) is a village in the administrative district of Gmina Namysłów, within Namysłów County, Opole Voivodeship, in south-western Poland.

References

Villages in Namysłów County